Dace Ruskule (born September 20, 1981) is a retired Latvian discus thrower. She represented her nation Latvia at the 2004 Summer Olympics, and later became a titleholder in women's discus throw at the 2006 NCAA Track and Field Championships in Sacramento, California, representing her collegiate team Nebraska Cornhuskers in the United States.

Ruskule qualified for the women's discus throw at the 2004 Summer Olympics in Athens, by achieving a personal best of 59.68 from the Latvian Championships in Riga. She threw a discus with a satisfying distance of 57.43 metres on her second attempt in the prelims, but fell short to compete for the final round with a twenty-eighth overall place effort.

References

External links
 
 Player Bio – Nebraska Cornhuskers
 
 
 

1981 births
Living people
Latvian female discus throwers
Olympic athletes of Latvia
Athletes (track and field) at the 2004 Summer Olympics
Nebraska Cornhuskers women's track and field athletes
People from Bauska